Jamie Lee may refer to:

Jamie Lee (comedian), American comedian, writer, and actress
Jamie Lee (cricketer), New Zealand cricketer
Jamie Lee (Gaelic footballer), Irish sportsman

See also

Lee (English surname)